Schottel is a manufacturer of propulsion and steering systems for ships and offshore applications. The company founder Josef Becker invented the rudderpropeller, a z-drive, in 1950. Today the company develops and manufactures azimuth propulsion, maneuvering and steering systems. In 2014 the subsidiary Schottel Hydro was founded to bundle up the company activities in the hydrokinetic energy segment.

History

Early beginnings
In 1921 Josef Becker (1897–1973) founded his craftsman's enterprise in an old farmhouse in Spay on the Rhine. In 1925 he designed and built his first shallop, followed by the first motorboat in 1928. In the mid 1930s Becker bought part of the present-day company premises and founded Schottel Werft. He named his enterprise after a section of the river Rhine which is called Auf der Schottel and located close by in Osterspai.

From shipyard to ship propulsion
With the beginning of the 1950s Becker started working on his invention, a ship propeller that is steerable through 360 degrees. In 1951 the company's own motorboat was equipped with the first Schottel Rudderpropeller, which Becker called SRP. Soon, the rudderpropeller was known as a propulsion unit for small fast patrol craft for the German police and government. At the end of this decade Schottel opened its first subsidiary abroad in the Netherlands. In 1967, Janus, the first tractor tug equipped with two rudderpropellers, was launched in Hamburg.

The next Schottel propulsion system was launched in 1978: The Schottel Pump Jet was designed for operation in shallow waters and installed flush with a vessel's hull. In 1996 the portfolio expanded with the Schottel Twin Propeller, a twin version of the rudderpropeller. In 2003, the Schottel Combi Drive was established with an electric motor which is vertically integrated into the support tube of the rudderpropeller. In 1998 Schottel opened a new production plant in Suzhou, China. The following year, Schottel acquired WPM Wismarer Propeller-und Maschinenbau GmbH which was merged in the newly founded Schottel Schiffsmaschinen and a new Schottel GmbH office in Wismar.
Schottel expands its production capacities in Dörth, an industrial park surrounding the Schottel headquarters in Spay. In summer 2015,  of production and office space will be available.

Schottel worldwide
Schottel GmbH has its headquarters in Spay, two German subsidiaries in Hamburg and Wismar, and a network of subsidiary agencies in several countries and regions.

Schottel subsidiaries
Schottel Nederland, 1958
Schottel US, 1961
Schottel France, 1971
Schottel Far East, 1976
Schottel do Brasil, 1975
Schottel Suzhou Propulsion, China, 1998
Schottel Schiffsmaschinen (formerly known as Wismarer Propeller Maschinen), 1999
Schottel Russia, 2011
Schottel Middle East, 2011
Schottel Suzhou Trading & Service, 2011
Schottel Australia, 2013
Frydenbø Schottel Nordic, 2013
Schottel de Colombia, 2014
Schottel Hydro, Germany, 2014

Core business
Since Schottel developed the first Z-drive in the 1950s the product portfolio has been extended by a range of thruster types (selection).

The Schottel Rudderpropeller
The idea of the rudderpropeller was the result of Becker's thoughts about the propulsion plants that took up too much space on board. He was looking for a system that could be installed space-efficiently with good maneuvering properties and developed a Z-drive system with a propeller that could be endlessly steered through 360 degrees. A classic application for rudderpropellers is tugs as the example of Janus shows. The first tractor tug was commissioned in 1967 in the Port of Hamburg. It was equipped with two Schottel Rudderpropellers in the front third of the vessel.

The Schottel Rudderpropeller is used in almost any kind of vessel from offshore vessels to tugs. It is available as a fixed pitch or controllable-pitch propeller. It is also available as a hydraulically retractable system for open-water service, dynamic positioning or varying water depths and underwater mountable thruster for ships that need to reduce docking times.

In 2014 Schottel introduced a rudderpropeller with an additional electric motor (PTI - power take in) as a hybrid propulsion concept. Here, the electric motor suffices for partial-load duties, the diesel engine is employed for operation at greater load, and the electric motor can be switched on to provide additional power. The PTI and diesel engine are centrally-controlled as a single system. This thruster is installed in the tug Eddy, built by Holland Shipyard.

The Schottel Twin Propeller
The demand for increasing power ratings could first be answered with larger rudderpropellers. Limits were set to this trend by mechanical stress and the fact that with an increasing propeller diameter, the draft of the vessel inevitably increases. Schottel therefore developed a thruster where the required power is divided between two counter-rotating thrusters that share a single shaft. The Twin Propeller is equipped with a pull propeller and a push propeller. The vortex street of the front pull propeller passes between the blades of the rear push propeller without impeding it. Contraction of the slip stream in the pull propeller means that more water reaches the push propeller from the sides. The strut is equipped with a fin, thus the swirl energy generated in the propeller stream is recovered. Additionally, the flow around the fins creates a lift component in the thrust direction, which has a thrust-enhancing effect.

The Schottel Combi Drive
The Combi Drive is based on the Schottel Rudderpropeller and combines its characteristics with the principle of an electric drive. The Combi Drive exists in both single and twin propeller versions. Instead of an above-water gearbox, the electric motor is integrated into the vertical shaft of the thruster. In combination with a power management system, electric drives increase the efficiency of the propulsion system and reduce fuel consumption. Electric energy generation systems produce only the power currently required and distribute it to the various consumers.

The Schottel Pump Jet
Schottel developed the Pump Jet for shallow waters. It is also used as an additional maneuvering aid for main propulsion or as a redundant auxiliary propulsion unit. An impeller sucks in water from under the hull and forces it into a pump housing. The outlet nozzles are integrated into an azimuthing base plate which is installed flush with the hull.

The Schottel Controllable Pitch Propeller
Schottel Controllable Pitch Propellers can be used in several vessel types like bigger ferries, container ships, heavy lift vessels or offshore supply vessels. Unlike a conventional fixed pitch propeller, the blades can be rotated and change their pitches variably from zero thrust to headway or reversing.

The Schottel Transverse Thruster
Transverse Thrusters are installed in the bow or stern of a vessel in order to improve maneuverability. Depending on the type of vessel, the range of application for Transverse Thrusters extends from harbor maneuvering to positioning tasks offshore. The units can be installed either with a horizontal or vertical motor flange.

Schottel Hydro
Schottel Hydro bundles up the hydrokinetic energy business of Schottel. The subsidiary comprises activities in three segments: instream turbines for river and tidal currents, semi-submerged platforms and components, such as turbine hubs and drives. Turbines can be combined to meet higher power demands. A platform will be installed in 2016 in the Bay of Fundy, Canada.

Selected projects

Awards
In 2004 the Elmer A. Sperry Award was given posthumously to Schottel founder Josef Becker for the invention of the propeller.

References

External links
Schottel website

Marine propulsion
Engineering companies of Germany